Cyperus felipponei is a species of sedge that is endemic to parts of South America.

The species was first formally described by the botanist Georg Kükenthal in 1936.

See also
 List of Cyperus species

References

felipponei
Taxa named by Georg Kükenthal
Plants described in 1936
Flora of Argentina
Flora of Brazil
Flora of Uruguay
Flora of Venezuela